Megachile malayana is a species of bee in the family Megachilidae. It was described by Cameron in 1901.

References

Malayana
Insects described in 1901